Brajesh Katheriya is an Indian politician and a member of the Uttar Pradesh Legislative Assembly in India. He represents the Kishni constituency of Uttar Pradesh and is a member of the Samajwadi Party political party.

Early life and  education
Brajesh Katheriya was born in Mainpuri district. He holds a Diploma in Engineering and BA degree. Katheriya belongs to the Scheduled caste community.

Political career
Brajesh Katheriya has been a MLA for two terms. He represented the Kishni constituency and is a member of the Samajwadi Party political party.

Posts held

See also

 Kishni (Assembly constituency)
 Sixteenth Legislative Assembly of Uttar Pradesh
 Uttar Pradesh Legislative Assembly

References 

1968 births
Living people
People from Mainpuri district
Samajwadi Party politicians
Uttar Pradesh MLAs 2012–2017
Uttar Pradesh MLAs 2017–2022
Uttar Pradesh MLAs 2022–2027